The Causeway Tower and Garage is an historic building in Victoria, British Columbia, Canada. Originally built in 1930-31 as a service centre for the Imperial Oil Company, it is now a visitors centre, gift shop and a restaurant.

See also
 List of historic places in Victoria, British Columbia

References

External links
 

1931 establishments in Canada
Buildings and structures completed in 1931
Buildings and structures in Victoria, British Columbia
Visitor centers